Cyrtostylis reniformis, commonly known as common gnat-orchid, is a species of orchid endemic to eastern Australia. It usually has a single kidney-shaped leaf and a flowering spike with up to eight reddish flowers with a shelf-like labellum.

Description
The petals are similar in size and shape to the lateral sepals and curve downwards. Flowering occurs from May to October.

Taxonomy and naming
Cyrtostylis reniformis was first formally described in 1810 by Robert Brown and the description was published in Prodromus Florae Novae Hollandiae et Insulae Van Diemen.
The specific epithet (reniformis) means "kidney-shaped".

Distribution and habitat
Common gnat-orchid is widespread and locally common in all Australian states and the Australian Capital Territory, except Western Australia.

References

External links
 

reniformis
Endemic orchids of Australia
Orchids of New South Wales
Orchids of the Australian Capital Territory
Orchids of Queensland
Orchids of South Australia
Orchids of Tasmania
Orchids of Victoria (Australia)
Orchids of Western Australia
Plants described in 1810
Taxa named by Robert Brown (botanist, born 1773)